A list of films produced by the Israeli film industry in 1993.

1993 releases

Unknown premiere date

Awards

Notable deaths

 February 16 – Amos Gutman, Israeli film director (b. 1954)

See also
1993 in Israel

References

External links
 Israeli films of 1993 at the Internet Movie Database

Israeli
Film
1993